Çeşme Castle is a historic castle in Çeşme, Turkey.

Location
Cezayirli Gazi Hasan Paşa Monument is in front of the castle and Çeşme Museum is a situated in the castle.

History
During the Growth of the Ottoman Empire, Çeşme was attacked twice by the Venetians in 1472 and in 1501. The castle was built as a precaution against further attacks. It  was built in 1508 during the reign of the Ottoman sultan Bayezit II. Its commissioner was Mir Haydar, the governor of Aidin Vilayet. It was originally a seaside castle but because of the alluvial deposits it is now slightly inland. The castle became a Tentative World Heritage Site in 2020.

Castle and the activities

The rectangular plan castle has moats on three sides six bastions. It is used as a festival center. Both Çeşme International Music festival and Çeşme festival are held in the castle.

References

Buildings and structures in İzmir Province
Castles in Turkey
Buildings and structures completed in 1508
Çeşme
World Heritage Tentative List for Turkey
Buildings and structures of the Ottoman Empire